The Partenavia P.55 Tornado was a 1950s Italian high-performance competition and touring monoplane built by Partenavia. The Tornado was a small mid-wing cantilever monoplane with a retractable tricycle landing gear. The aircraft was powered by a nose-mounted Lycoming O-320 piston engine.

The aircraft was commissioned to win the Tour of Sicily (it: Giro di Sicilia), and the Tornado won the race in 1956. Although the aircraft had won the race it was too specialised design to enter production and only one aircraft (registered I-REGJ) was built. I-REGJ was destroyed in a crash on 13 June 1958.

Specifications

References

 
 

 

Tornado
1950s Italian sport aircraft
Racing aircraft
Mid-wing aircraft
Single-engined tractor aircraft
Aircraft first flown in 1955